Harry's Gone Fishing is a 1999 album by Leon Rosselson.

It contains eleven songs, ten of which were original Rosselson compositions. The other, "You Noble Diggers All" was reissued from his 1979 album, If I Knew Who The Enemy Was (where it had originally appeared under the title, "The Diggers Song") and is about the Diggers movement, with words by the 17th century Digger Gerrard Winstanley set to music by Rosselson.

Musicians on the album include Robb Johnson and Martin Carthy.

Track listing

1999 albums
Leon Rosselson albums